The Den, formerly known as The New Den, is the current home of Millwall FC, located in Bermondsey, London

The Den may also refer to:

 The Old Den, formerly known as The Den, once the home of Millwall FC, was located in New Cross, London
 Lamport Stadium, rugby league stadium in Toronto, Canada, known as The Den when hosting Toronto Wolfpack RLFC home games
The Den (TV programme), a children's television strand
The Den (2013 film), a 2013 horror film by Zachary Donohue starring Melanie Papalia

See also
 Den (disambiguation)